This is a list of legume dishes. A legume is a plant in the family Fabaceae (or Leguminosae), or the fruit or seed of such a plant. Legumes are grown agriculturally, primarily for their food grain seed (e.g. beans and lentils, or generally pulse), for livestock forage and silage, and as soil-enhancing green manure.

Legume dishes

0–9

A

B

C

 Callos
 Caparrones
 Cassoulet
 Chana masala
 Chapea
 Cholent
 Chili con carne
 Chole bhature
 Ciceri e Tria
 Cocido lebaniego
 Cocido madrileño
 Cocido Montañés
 Cowboy beans

D

E

F

G

H

J

K

L

M

N

O

P

R

S

T

U

V

W

Y

See also

 Common bean
 Pakistani legume dishes
 List of bean soups
 List of chickpea dishes
 List of edible seeds
 List of peanut dishes
 List of foods
 List of soups
 List of soy-based foods
 List of vegetable dishes

References

External links
 

 
Legume dishes